Harvest Of Hits is an original jazz compilation by Nat King Cole released by Capitol Records in 1950.  Both a 10 – inch (33-1/3rpm) LP version containing 8 tracks, and a 6-track boxed set of three 7 – inch (45rpm) discs was released. The album features Oscar Moore on guitar, Johnny Miller on bass and Lee Young on drums.

Track listing 
10-inch LP version
LP side A
"Straighten Up and Fly Right" (Cole, Mills)
"You Call It Madness (But I Call It Love)" (Conrad, Columbo, DuBois, Gregory)
"(Get Your Kicks On) Route 66" (Troup)
"Lush Life" (Strayhorn)
LP side B
"Kee-mo Ky-mo (The Magic Song)" (Alfred, Hilliard)
"Gee Baby, Ain't I Good to You" (Razaf, Redman)
"The Frim Fram Sauce" (Ricardel, Evans)
"Nature Boy" (ahbez)

 Three 7" discs version
 Disc 1
 "Straighten Up and Fly Right"
 "You Call It Madness (But I Call It Love)"
 Disc 2
 "(Get Your Kicks On) Route 66"
 "Gee Baby, Ain't I Good To You?"
 Disc 3
 "The Frim Fram Sauce"
 "Nature Boy"

References 

A Pile o' Cole's Nat King Cole Website
Capitol Records discography at bsnpubs.com
Capitol H 213 (10-inch LP)
Capitol EBF 213 (boxed set of three 7 inch 45 rpm discs)

1950 greatest hits albums
Nat King Cole albums
Capitol Records compilation albums
Jazz compilation albums